Grecav is an Italian automobile and farm machinery manufacturer from Gonzaga, province of Mantua. The company produces, among other things, light motor vehicles. The company was founded in 1964 by Cav. Bruno Grespan (current President) through the merger of two companies; Fratelli Grespan S.n.c. (founded in 1956) and Cavalletti S.n.c. (founded in 1922).

See also 

List of Italian companies

External links

Auto parts suppliers of Italy
Car manufacturers of Italy
Vehicle manufacturing companies established in 1964
Italian companies established in 1964
Italian brands
Companies based in Mantua